The Upper Austria Open is a professional tennis tournament played on clay courts. It is currently part of the Association of Tennis Professionals (ATP) Challenger Tour. It has been held in Mauthausen, Austria since 2022.

Past finals

Singles

Doubles

References

External links
Tournament on ATP website

ATP Challenger Tour
Clay court tennis tournaments
Tennis tournaments in Austria
Upper Austria Open